C. hirta  may refer to:
 Caladenia hirta, an orchid species in the genus Caladenia
 Calamidia hirta, a moth species found in Australia, from Queensland to Tasmania
 Calamagrostis hirta, a grass species found only in Ecuador
 Carex hirta, a sedge species in the genus Carex
 Cladophlebis hirta, an extinct fern species which grew during the Mesozoic and late Paleozoic eras
 Clidemia hirta, the soapbush or Koster's curse, a perennial shrub species invasive in many tropical regions of the world
 Crocidura hirta, the lesser red musk shrew, a mammal species found in Africa
 Cyrtophora hirta, a spider species in the genus Cyrtophora found in Queensland

See also
 Hirta (disambiguation)